Nothing Is is a live album by the American composer, bandleader and keyboardist Sun Ra, recorded in 1966 and released on the ESP-Disk label in 1970. In 2010 ESP-Disk released an expanded 2CD edition, restoring the full concert on disc one and adding part of the second set and some tracks from the sound check on disc two.

Reception
The AllMusic review by Lindsay Planer stated: "Sun Ra and his Arkestra issued only a handful of titles on the groundbreaking indie ESP-Disk label. Each title respectively contains some of their most expressive musical statements to date".

Track listing
All compositions by Sun Ra

12" Vinyl
Side A:
 "Dancing Shadows" - 9:50
 "Imagination" - 1:53
 "Exotic Forest" - 9:50
Side B:
"Sun Ra and His Band from Outer Space" - 1:58
 "Shadow World" - 13:48
 "Theme of the Stargazers" - 0:40
 "Outer Spaceways Incorporated" - 1:42
 "Next Stop Mars" - 0:38
Track lengths on cover differ significantly from actual playing times given above.
This version is also available on CD (without the bonus tracks below) as ZYX-Music / ESP 1045-2.

CD Bonus Tracks
"Velvet" - 7:20  
 "Outer Nothingness" - 15:43  
 "We Travel the Spaceways" - 1:30  
Recorded live on tour of New York state colleges in March 1966.

2CD Deluxe Edition
"Disc One" (66/5/18 - first set)
 "Sun Ra And HIs Band From Outer Space" - 14:02
 "The Shadow World" - 4:40
 "Interpolation" - 2:18
 "The Satellites Are Spinning" - 1:17
 "Advice To Medics" - 2:50
 "Velvet" - 8:16
 "Space Aura" - 10:26
 "The Exotic Forest" - 9:43
 "Theme Of The Stargazers" - 1:52
 "Outer Spaceways Incorporated" - 2:24
 "Dancing Shadows" - 9:45
 "Imagination" - 0:40
 "The Second Stop Is Jupiter" - 1:12 
 "Next Stop Mars" - 0:41
"Disc Two" (66/5/18 - partial second set and sound check)
 "The Satellites Are Spinning" - 9:08
 "Velvet" - 7:10
 "Interplanetary Chaos" - 4:35
 "Theme Of The Stargazers" - 1:30
 "The Second Stop Is Jupiter" - 11:16
 "We Travel The Spaceways" - 1:42
 "Nothing Is" - 6:13
 "It Is Eternal" - 12:37
 "State Street" - 8:21
 The Exotic Forest" - 4:32

Personnel
Sun Ra - piano, clavioline
Ali Hassan, Teddy Nance - trombone 
Marshall Allen - alto saxophone, flute, piccolo, oboe
John Gilmore - tenor saxophone
Pat Patrick - baritone saxophone, flute
Robert Cummings - bass clarinet
James Jacson - flute, log drums
Ronnie Boykins - bass, tuba
Clifford Jarvis, Roger Blank, Jimmy Johnson - drum
Carl S. Malone, Nimrod Hunt - sun horn, gong

References

1970 live albums
ESP-Disk live albums
Sun Ra live albums